Random Acts of Flyness is an American late-night sketch comedy television series created by Terence Nance that premiered on August 4, 2018 on HBO. Additionally, Nance appears in each episode of the series which he also wrote, directed, and executive produced. On August 20, 2018, it was announced that the series had been renewed for a second season. Season 2 premiered in December 2022.

Premise
Random Acts of Flyness is described as a "fluid, mind-melting stream-of-conscious response to the contemporary American mediascape" in which each episode will "feature interconnected vignettes that makes the series a unique mix of vérité documentary, musical performances, surrealist melodrama and humorous animation."

Production

Development
On January 29, 2018, it was announced that HBO had given the production a series order for a first season consisting of six episodes. The series was created by Terence Nance who will also write, direct, and executive produce. Producers are reportedly looking to cast a diverse group of performers with black actors eyed for many of the roles. Production companies involved in the series include MVMT.

On July 2, 2018, it was announced that the series would premiere on August 4, 2018. It was also reported that additional executive producers would include Tamir Muhammad, Jamund Washington, Kishori Rajan, Kelley Robins Hicks, Chanelle Aponte Pearson, Ravi Nandan, and John Hodges and that A24 had been added as an additional production company involved with the series. On August 20, 2018, it was announced that HBO had renewed the series for a second season.

Casting
Alongside the announcement of the series premiere, it was confirmed that Terence Nance would appear in all six episodes of the first season with guests including Whoopi Goldberg, Dominique Fishback, Gillian Jacobs, Jon Hamm, Ntare Guma Mwine, Adepero Oduye, Natalie Paul, Lakeith Stanfield, Tonya Pinkins, and Paul Sparks.

Marketing
On July 2, 2018, the first promo for the series was released.

Episodes

Season 1 (2018)

Season 2 (2022)

Reception
The series has been met with a positive response from critics since its premiere, and has gone on to win a 2018 Peabody Award. On the review aggregation website Rotten Tomatoes, the series holds a 100% approval rating with an average rating of 8.45 out of 10 based on 25 reviews. The website's critical consensus reads, "Random Acts of Flyness poignant political poetry plays in harmony with its frenetic absurdist humor to create a singular musical television experience." Metacritic, which uses a weighted average, assigned the series a score of 83 out of 100 based on 7 critics, indicating "universal acclaim".

In a positive review, The Los Angeles Timess Robert Lloyd offered the series praise saying, "Its meanings are sometimes obscure and sometimes obvious, nearly to the point of being polemical, and most often somewhere in between. But its surfaces are always interesting and splendidly executed. Even the glitches are artfully placed." In a similarly positive critique, The Hollywood Reporters Robyn Bahr described the series as "a beautiful sensory overload" and commended the series visual look saying, "the protean barrage of imagery and gonzo sound design overwhelms the senses. Once your brain gets used to its staccato rhythm, however, you settle in for the ride. Although I couldn't quite process all the nuances within the moment, I still found myself nodding along (and even dancing along) all the same." In another favorable assessment, Varietys Caroline Framke commended the series' various segments saying, "they all reveal incisive truths about what it means to be black in America — or actually, "reveal" isn’t quite the right word, and neither is "show." Instead Acts of Flyness wants to make its (white) audience feel what it means to be black in America."

References

External links
 
 

English-language television shows
HBO original programming
2018 American television series debuts
2010s American sketch comedy television series
2010s American late-night television series
2020s American sketch comedy television series
2020s American late-night television series
Television series by A24
Television series by Anonymous Content